Présent was a French newspaper (published five days a week). The paper was founded in 1982. It was close to the French Front National, and followed a traditionalist Catholic editorial line. Jean Madiran was for long its editor in chief.

The paper ceased publication in June 2022.

References

External links
 Official website

1982 establishments in France
Far-right politics in France
National Rally (France)
Newspapers published in Paris
Publications established in 1982
Traditionalist Catholic newspapers
Daily newspapers published in France
2022 disestablishments in France
Defunct newspapers published in France
Publications disestablished in 2022